The 1975 Currie Cup was the 37th edition of the Currie Cup, the premier annual domestic rugby union competition in South Africa.

Fixtures and Results

Final

See also

 Currie Cup

References

1975
1975 in South African rugby union
1975 rugby union tournaments for clubs